Die 3 Colonias ("the three Coloniad") is a music group from Cologne with many activities in the Cologne Carnival. Their predominant language of performances is Colognian.

They were founded in 1976 by the Cologne Dieter Steudter. Trained confectioner Steudter ran his own café on the Kaiser-Wilhelm-Ring until the mid-1980s, when he had to give up for health reasons. Since the beginning of the 1970s, he began to compose and write and even to play in the carnival. He was accompanied by accordionist Walter Haarhaus. To emulate their role models, the Eilemann Trio, a bassist, Paul Rumpen, joined the group, followed two years later by Oliver Hoff.

Their breakthrough had the group with the songs "Ja die Oma will nach Palma" and "Bier und nen Appelkorn". For the ice hockey club Kölner Haie the group composed and produced in 1980 the fan anthem "Wir sind die Haie". In 1993 Dieter Steudter composed the carnival hit "Eimol Prince zo sin" for Wicky Junggeburth, which also produced the 3 colonies and published.

In 1992, Walter Haarhaus left the 3 colonies, for him came Andreas Weber as keyboardist. Oliver Hoff began a solo career as a comedian and Millowitsch impersonator; He was followed by Willi Wilden. 2001 Frank Morawa took over the place of Andreas Weber. 2013, guitarist and singer Robert Lennerts and keyboarder / accordionist and singer Marcus Schmitter performed, appearing since 1990 as "Die Original Bergischen Gaudibuam" and since 2006 as "De Spetzbove", Willi Wilden and Dieter Steudter, working together with keyboarder Frank Morawa Cast of the music group. Robert Lennerts left the group in 2015 for professional reasons. For him came Fred Isenberg as a new singer. Dieter Steudter remained in the group until 2015 as manager. [5]

The most famous recordings of The 3 Colonies were released as singles. They have also been well received outside the region, including a drinking song of beer and an Appelkorn (beer and an apple and corn schnapps) and In Africa is Mother's Day (Today is Mother's Day in Africa), as well as "Halt's Maul, sei still" (be quiet) and "Ob Kölsch, ob Pils, ob Alt" (Kölsch, whether Pils, whether Alt).

Discography

LPs 
 1992: Die großen Erfolge – Pavement Records, Bergisch Gladbach
 1996: Hallo Kölle! – Pavement Records  
 2009: Volldampf – Wolfgang Löhr, Köln
 2010: Weihnachten mit den 3 Colonias – Wolfgang Löhr, Köln
 2014: Kuh-Tipps, Quatsch & Fastelovend - Dabbelju Music

Singles 
 1983: Bier und ’nen Appelkorn – Colonia-Musik-Produktion; 1984  EMI-Electrola
 1983: Nein, nein, nein, das darf doch nich wahr sein (Fussball-Ballade) – Margaretha Jansen, Köln 
 1984: Ja, de Oma will nach Palma – blm music entertainment, Bad Honnef
 1984: In zehntausend Jahren – blm, Bad Honnef  
 1984: Hurra, hurra (das Sünderlied) – EMI-Electrola
 1984: Ach du leeven Jott – blm, Bad Honnef  
 1985: In Afrika ist Muttertag – EMI-Electrola
 1986: Aufe Dauer … (dat Maloche-Lied) – EMI-Electrola
 1988: Oh, wie tut das gut! – EMI-Electrola
 1988: Es war in Königswinter – EMI-Electrola
 1991: Mir sin zwar kein 18 [achtzehn] mieh – Pavement Records
 1994: Sulang d'r Dom noch steiht  - Pavement Records
 1995: Wie dä Kääl dat bloss määt?! – Pavement Records
2002: Der Schützenkönig - Papagayo Musikverlage Hans Gerig oHG
2005: Vera (zeig mir dein Dessous) – Pavement Records
2006. Die Fröschelche - Dabbelju
2008: Halt´s Maul, sei still (ich geh Heim, wann ich will) - Dabbelju
2009: Die alte Dampfeisenbahn - Dabbelju
2009: Eimol Prinz zo sin in Kölle am Rhing - Dabbelju
2011: Ich han en Mötz, ich bin jetz Präsident – Dabbelju/Pavement Records
2012: Muh, Muh, ich bin ne Kuh – Alaaf! Records/recordJet/Dabbelju/Xtreme Sound
2013: Wir sind die Haie (Neuaufnahme) – Alaaf! Records/recordJet
2014: So schön ist´s nur einmal (Der Song zum "Aufstieg 2014" des 1. FC Köln) – Alaaf! Records/recordJet
2014: Und die Hände gehen so - a la tete records
2014: Ich dräume met offene Auge vun Dir – Dabbelju
2015: Sulang d'r Dom noch steiht (Neuaufnahme) – Alaaf! Records/recordJet/Dabbelju
2016: Ob Kölsch, ob Pils, ob Alt – Alaaf! Records/recordJet/Moewe-Musik/Hitmix Musikagentur
2017: Ach wenn doch nur jeden Tag Karneval wär – Alaaf! Records/recordJet/Moewe-Musik/Hitmix Musikagentur
2018: Lustig sein (1x Lululu) - Alaaf! Records/Moewe-Musik/Hitmix Musikagentur/Dabbelju Music

Awards 
 1993: Honorary membership in the club Cologne Carnival for Walter Haarhaus
2010: Das Herz von Kölle (The Heart Of Cologne)
2012: Honorary membership in the club Cologne Carnival for Dieter Steudter
2012: Order of Merit in gold of the festival committee Kölner Karneval for Dieter Steudter

External links 
Die 3 Colonias on the Internet
Die 3 Colonias on the website of the club Cologne Carnival
Music by Die 3 Colonias in the catalog of the German National Library

References 

Carnival music
Colognian dialect
German musical trios
Musical groups from Cologne